Gabriel Gustavo Alanís (born 16 March 1994) is an Argentine professional footballer who plays as a left midfielder for Defensa y Justicia on loan from Godoy Cruz.

Career
After being in the youth ranks for eleven years, Alanís made his debut for Argentine Primera División side Belgrano in October 2014 against Banfield; coming on late in a 2–2 draw. In his first three seasons with the club, Alanís made sixteen appearances in all competitions. After ten further appearances in his fourth season, 2016–17, he failed to play during 2017–18. On 16 January 2018, Alanís joined Arsenal de Sarandí on loan. He scored his first career goal for Arsenal against Patronato in April 2018. 

Alanís agreed to sign for Godoy Cruz on 11 June, following the relegation of Belgrano to Primera B Nacional. In 2021, he was out on loan at Sarmiento and in January 2022, he was once again sent out on loan, this time to Defensa y Justicia until the end of 2022 with a purchase option.

Career statistics
.

References

External links

1994 births
Living people
Footballers from Córdoba, Argentina
Argentine footballers
Association football midfielders
Argentine Primera División players
Club Atlético Belgrano footballers
Arsenal de Sarandí footballers
Godoy Cruz Antonio Tomba footballers
Club Atlético Sarmiento footballers
Defensa y Justicia footballers